Tetracha sommeri is a species of tiger beetle that was described by Maximilien Chaudoir in 1850.

References

Beetles described in 1850
Cicindelidae